Volnov (from воля meaning will) is a Russian masculine surname, its feminine counterpart is Volnova. It may refer to
Gennadi Volnov (1939–2008), Russian basketball player
Marina Volnova (born 1989), Kazakhstani boxer

Russian-language surnames